Georgia Hilleard (born 1999) is a female British international track cyclist.

Cycling career
Hilleard became a British team champion after winning the team sprint Championship at the 2018 British National Track Championships with Lauren Bate.

References

1999 births
Living people
British female cyclists
British track cyclists
Sportspeople from Wolverhampton